Frank E. Edbrooke (1840 – May 3, 1921), also known as F.E. Edbrooke, was a 19th and early 20th century architect in Denver, Colorado who has been termed the "dean" of Denver architecture.  Several of his surviving works are listed on the National Register of Historic Places including Brinker Collegiate Institute, built in 1880 and NRHP-listed in 1977.

His brother was nationally prominent architect Willoughby J. Edbrooke (1843–1896), who served as Supervising Architect for Federal buildings during 1891–92.  Willoughby's son, Harry W.J. Edbrooke, worked with Frank.

Frank E. Edbrooke died in Glendale, California on May 3, 1921.

Works (attribution to Frank E. Edbrooke (and variations on his name))
Brinker Collegiate Institute, built 1880, 1725–1727 Tremont Pl., Denver, CO (Edbrooke,F.E.), NRHP-listed
Brown Palace Hotel, 17th St. and Tremont Pl., Denver, CO (Edbrooke,Frank E.), NRHP-listed designed with an odd triangular shape
Burlington Hotel, 2205 Larimer St., Denver, CO (Edbrooke, Frank E.), NRHP-listed
Bernalillo County Courthouse, 2000 Lomas Blvd NW, Albuquerque, NM (Edbrooke, Frank E.), demolished, 1910
Alfred Butters House, 1129 Pennsylvania, Denver, CO (Edbrooke, Frank E.), NRHP-listed
Central Presbyterian Church, 1660 Sherman St., Denver, CO (Edbrooke, F. E.), NRHP-listed
Denver Dry Goods Company Building, 16th and California Sts., Denver, CO (Edbrooke, Frank E.), NRHP-listed
William G. Fisher House, 1600 Logan St., Denver, CO (Edbrooke, Frank E.), NRHP-listed
Hendrie and Bolthoff Warehouse Building, 1743 Wazee, Denver, CO (Edbrooke,Frank E.), NRHP-listed
Joslin Dry Goods Company Building, 934 16th St., Denver, CO (Edbrooke, Frank E.), NRHP-listed
Loretto Heights Academy, 3001 S. Federal Blvd., Denver, CO (Edbrooke, F.E.), NRHP-listed
Masonic Temple Building, Richardsonian Romanesque style building from 1889, 1614 Welton St., Denver, CO (Edbrooke, Frank E.), NRHP-listed
Riverside Cemetery, 5201 Brighton Blvd., Denver, CO (Edbrooke, Frank E.), NRHP-listed
George Schleier Mansion, 1665 Grant St., Denver, CO (Edbrooke, F.E.), NRHP-listed
Silverton Miner's Union Hospital, 1315 Snowden Street, Silverton-San Juan County, CO (Edbrooke, Frank E.)
Spratlen-Anderson Wholesale Grocery Company-Davis Brothers Warehouse, 1450 Wynkoop St., Denver, CO (Edbrooke, Frank E.), NRHP-listed
Steamboat Springs Depot, 39265 Routt County Rd. 33B, Steamboat Springs, CO (Edbrooke, Frank E.), NRHP-listed
Temple Emanuel, 2400 Curtis St., Denver, CO (Edbrooke, Frank E.), NRHP-listed

Other
Architect Frederick Sterner worked as a draftsman with architect Frank E. Edbrooke and had a twenty-year career in Colorado.

Architect Hart Wood, in 1900, joined Frank E. Edbrooke & Company, who had designed the Brown Palace Hotel (1892).

References

External links
 

19th-century American architects
Architecture firms based in Colorado
Architects from Denver
1840 births
1921 deaths
20th-century American architects